Hadath Baalbek is a village  in the Baalbek District of the Baalbek-Hermel Governorate in Lebanon.

History
In 1838, Eli Smith noted el-Hadeth's population as being predominantly  Metawileh.

References

Bibliography

External links
Hadath Baalbek, localiban

Populated places in Baalbek District
Shia Muslim communities in Lebanon